The following is a list of awards and nominations received by American comedian, television host, actress, writer, and producer Ellen DeGeneres. Among them, she has won 33 Daytime Emmy Awards, a Primetime Emmy Award and a Golden Globe Award, and received nominations for three Grammy Awards and a Golden Raspberry Award.

Emmy Awards

Golden Globe Awards

Grammy Awards

People's Choice Awards

Producers Guild of America Awards

Screen Actors Guild Awards

Teen Choice Awards

Other awards

References

External links
 

DeGeneres, Ellen
Awards